The East African University (TEAU) is a private university in Kenya.

Location
The approximate coordinates of the university campus are:1° 39' 0.00"S, +36° 54' 0.00"E (Latitude:-1.6500; Longitude:36.9000). The coordinates are approximate because the university campus does not yet show on most publicly available maps in January 2012.

The university also has another campus located at View Park Towers, Utalii Lane within the CBD (Central Business District) in Nairobi.

History
The idea to start the university was conceived in 2005. In 2006,  of land were acquired in Kitengela, for the purpose of establishing the university. Application was then made to the Commission for University Education for a Tertiary Education Institution License. The license was granted in November 2010 and was handed over to the university officials by the chairman of the commission, Prof. Ezra Maritum.

Academics Schools
, the university maintains the following schools:

 School of Business and Management Studies
 School of Computer Science and Information Technology
 School of Education, Arts & Social Sciences

Courses
 Graduate School Courses
 None available as of January 2012

 Undergraduate Degree Courses
 Bachelor of Science in Business Management (Accounting)
 Bachelor of Science in Business Management (Sales & Marketing)
 Bachelor of Science in Business Management (Banking & Finance)
 Bachelor of Science in Business Management (Human Resource Management)
 Bachelor of Computer Science and Information Technology
 Bachelor of Education (Arts)
 Bachelor of Business Information Technology

 Diploma Courses

 Diploma in Computer Science and IT
 Diploma in Business Information Technology
 Diploma in Business Science with the options
 Diploma in Actuarial Science
 Diploma in Credit Management
 Diploma in Islamic Banking and FINANCE
 Diploma in Procurement and Supplies Management
 Diploma in Co-operative Management
 Diploma in Management of NGOs
 Diploma in Project Planning and Management

 Certificate Courses

 Certificate in Science in Computer Science and IT
 Certificate in Business Information Technology

Affiliation
The University of East Africa is affiliated with Kampala University, a multi-campus institution with its main campus located in Ggaba, a southeastern suburb of Kampala, the capital of Uganda and the largest city in that country. Professor Badru Kateregga, the Chairman of the Board of Trustees of TEAU also serves as the Vice Chancellor of Kampala University.

External links
 Homepage of TEAU

See also
 Education in Kenya
 List of universities in Kenya
 Kajiado
 Kampala University

References

Universities in Kenya
Educational institutions established in 2010
Kajiado County
Education in Rift Valley Province
2010 establishments in Kenya